Żelazno may refer to the following places in Poland:
Żelazno, Lower Silesian Voivodeship (south-west Poland)
Żelazno, Kościan County in Greater Poland Voivodeship (west-central Poland)
Żelazno, Piła County in Greater Poland Voivodeship (west-central Poland)
Żelazno, Warmian-Masurian Voivodeship (north Poland)